The 1955 UCI Track Cycling World Championships were the World Championship for track cycling. They took place in Milan, Italy from 31 August to 5 September 1955. Five events for men were contested, three for professionals and two for amateurs.

Medal summary

Medal table

See also
 1955 UCI Road World Championships

References

Track cycling
UCI Track Cycling World Championships by year
International cycle races hosted by Italy
Sports competitions in Milan
1955 in track cycling
August 1955 sports events in Europe
September 1955 sports events in Europe
1950s in Milan